A sleigh bed is a style of bed with curved or scrolled foot and headboards, thus resembling a sled or sleigh.

Often made of wood and quite heavy, the sleigh bed is a result of the French and American Empire period of the early 19th century. The Empire style, and thus the American Empire style, drew its inspiration from the empires of ancient Rome and Greece.

Today's sleigh beds are made from a variety of materials including wood, iron, steel and aluminum, and often possess less exaggerated curves of the foot and headboards.

References

Beds